Mgła is a Polish black metal band.

History
Initially founded as a studio project in the year 2000 at Kraków by vocalist and multi-instrumentalist Mikołaj "M." Żentara with the collaboration of drummer Dariusz "Daren" Piper, both originally from the band Kriegsmaschine, together they recorded two unreleased demos, a collaboration split album with Deathspell Omega, Clandestine Blaze, Stabat Mater, Exordium and Musta Surma and their first 2 EPs. Daren left the band in 2006 and was replaced by Maciej "Darkside" Kowalski. The band signed to Northern Heritage Records in 2008 and released their debut album Groza in that same year, Mgła has been signed to Northern Heritage ever since.

In 2012 after the release of With Hearts Toward None the band started touring worldwide, they enlisted bassist The Fall and guitarist Silencer, originally from Black metal band Medico Peste, to complete their live lineup and according to M. rehearsed for over a year before hitting the road. In 2015 Silencer left the band and was replaced by E.V.T., also from Medico Peste, as live guitarist. The tour, which helped the band to gain notoriety, had various notable performances at well known metal festivals like Nidrosian Black Mass on Belgium, Brutal Assault on the Czech Republic and Dark Easter Metal Meeting and Party San on Germany. During the same year M. and Darkside created "No Solace"; a label and mailorder in which they catalogue the music from Mgła and other projects. Through "No Solace" M. and Darkside also release music under the Kriegsmaschine moniker. No Solace is also the name of Żentara's music studio.
From 2015 to 2016, the band's lineup joined Mikko Aspa's Clandestine Blaze for various shows.

On October 21, 2018 alongside the release of the third Kriegsmaschine album, the band announced they were working on their fourth studio album and that it would be released in 2019. On August 3, 2019 the band revealed that their fourth album would be titled Age of Excuse and released the track "Age of Excuse II" on the No Solace YouTube channel. Age of Excuse was released on September 2, 2019 on the band's Bandcamp and on CD through their label No Solace in collaboration with Northern Heritage, they also uploaded the album on streaming sites a week after the initial CD release. Northern Heritage released the vinyl version of the album on January 24, 2020. The band announced a European tour that lasted throughout September 2019 in support of the new album, and they also embarked on their first Latin American tour on the first quarter of 2020 but had to postpone or cancel future performances due to the COVID-19 pandemic. The band resumed touring in late 2021 and throughout 2022. On December 28, 2022 the band announced they would put live activities on hold as they shift their focus to studio work.

Controversy
In April 2019 the band went on a European tour with Revenge alongside guest bands Doombringer and Deus Mortem which was marred with controversy and two cancelled shows on Munich and Berlin after the German Antifa group "Linkes Bündnis gegen Antisemitismus München" (English: Left Alliance Against Anti-Semitism Munich) launched a boycott against Mgła because of their alleged associations to various National Socialist black metal artists, and accusing them of racism and Anti-Semitism. The group listed Mgła being signed to Mikko Aspa's label Northern Heritage Records; Aspa has long been accused of having extreme Far-right sympathies and ties with the NSBM scene in Finland and throughout Europe, the band's association with fellow Polish black metal band and tour mates Deus Mortem; which has members who on occasions played live with the openly RAC Polish band Honor, and NSBM bands Warhead and Thunderbolt as well as Mikołaj Żentara's past power electronics project "Leichenhalle", which one of its albums is titled “Judenfrei” (English: Free of Jews). Mgła have denied the accusations and proceeded to pursue legal action against "Linkes Bündnis" and the  sites that published their accusations, which the band described as false, a coordinated smear campaign and "defamation in print", they also asked fans to share the "defamatory publications" to support their case while offering apologies and discounts on the band's web store to those who planned to attend the cancelled concerts.

Members
Current
 M. (Mikołaj Żentara) – lead vocals, rhythm guitar, bass (studio only), lead guitar (studio only) (2000–present)
 Darkside (Maciej Kowalski) – drums, percussion (2006–present)

Former
 Daren (Dariusz Piper) – drums, percussion (2000–2006)

Live musicians
Current
 The Fall (Michał "ShellShocked" Stępień) – bass, backing vocals (2012–present)
 E.V.T. (Piotr Dziemski) – lead guitar, backing vocals (2015–present)

Former
 Silencer/Lazarus – lead guitar, backing vocals (2012–2015)

Discography

Studio albums
 Groza (2008)
 With Hearts Toward None (2012)
 Exercises in Futility (2015)
 Age of Excuse (2019)

EPs
 Presence (2006)
 Mdłości (2006)
 Further Down the Nest (2007)

Compilation albums
 Mdłości + Further Down the Nest (2007)
 Presence / Power and Will (2013)

Split albums
 Crushing the Holy Trinity (2005) with Deathspell Omega, Stabat Mater, Musta Surma, Clandestine Blaze, Exordium

Unreleased demos
 Northwards (2000)
 Necrotic (2001)

References

External links

Mgła on MySpace
Mgła on Bandcamp
Mgła on YouTube

Polish black metal musical groups
Musical groups established in 2000
Musicians from Kraków
2000 establishments in Poland
Heavy metal duos
Polish heavy metal musical groups
Black metal controversies